Tashi Wangdi was the representative to the Americas of the Dalai Lama, Tenzin Gyatso from April 16, 2005 to 2008.  Since 1966 he served the Central Tibetan Administration, Tibet's government-in-exile.  He held the position of kalon, or Cabinet Minister, in virtually every major department, including the Department of Religion and Culture, Department of Home, Department of Education, Department of Information and International Relations, Department of Security, and Department of Health.

Wangdi studied at Durham University, graduating with a degree in Politics and Sociology in 1973. He was formerly the Dalai Lama's representative to the Indian government in New Delhi.

"We are seeking a solution within the framework of the Chinese Constitution for a meaningful autonomy," said Wangdi of his government's status. "Until we are able to achieve that goal, we effectively have a government in exile with a charter —a Constitution. In that charter, His Holiness [the Dalai Lama] is effectively head of state, and the prime minister is head of government."

References

External links

Profile at the Office of Tibet
Statement to the Congressional-Executive Commission on China on The China-Dalai Lama Dialogue: Prospects for Progress, March 13, 2006

Year of birth missing (living people)
Living people
Tibetan people
Tibetan politicians
Foreign ministers of Tibet
Representatives of Offices of Tibet
Alumni of St Cuthbert's Society, Durham